The Bram Stoker Award for Short Fiction is an award presented by the Horror Writers Association (HWA) for "superior achievement" in horror writing for short fiction.

Winners and nominees
This category was previously titled "best short story". Nominees are listed below the winner(s) for each year.

Short story

Short fiction

References

External links
 Stoker Award on the HWA web page
 Graphical listing of all Bram Stoker award winners and nominees

Short Fiction
Short story awards
1987 establishments in the United States
Awards established in 1987
English-language literary awards